Sea of Love is a 1989 American neo-noir thriller film directed by Harold Becker, written by Richard Price and starring Al Pacino, Ellen Barkin and John Goodman. The story concerns a New York City detective trying to catch a serial killer who finds victims through the singles column in a newspaper. It is based on Price's 1978 novel Ladies' Man.

It was Pacino's first film after a four-year hiatus following the critical and commercial failure of Revolution. Sea of Love was a box-office success, grossing over $110 million.

Plot
New York City homicide detective Frank Keller is a burned-out alcoholic. His wife left him and married one of his colleagues, and he is depressed about reaching his 20th year on the police force. He is assigned to investigate the murder of a man in Manhattan, shot dead while face down in his bed, naked, listening to an old 45rpm recording of "Sea of Love." Keller has three clues — a lipstick-smeared cigarette, a want-ad that the dead man placed in a newspaper, and fingerprints of the perpetrator.

A second man dies in the same manner in Queens. Detective Sherman Touhey from the local precinct suggests that he and Frank collaborate. Both victims had placed rhyming ads in the lonely hearts column of the newspaper, seeking dates. The detectives track down Raymond Brown, the only other man with a rhyming ad. He's a married man who admits placing the ad but swears that he threw away all the letters and never saw anyone.  Frank gets an idea to place a rhyming ad in the paper, meet women who respond in a restaurant and take the prints from their drinking glasses. Frank's precinct chief is skeptical, but changes his mind when Brown turns up dead in the same manner as the other two murder victims.

Frank has dinner with several women, while Sherman — posing as a waiter — puts their glasses into evidence bags. One woman, divorcee Helen Cruger, shows no interest in Frank and leaves without taking a drink, so Frank is unable to get her fingerprints. Frank bumps into her again at a market, but this time she is more friendly. Helen manages a chic upscale shoe store. Frank does not reveal his true occupation.

Frank takes her to his place, against his better judgment and a warning from Sherman not to do so. They start getting passionate, but Frank panics after finding a gun in her purse and treats her roughly. Helen explains she keeps the starting pistol because she's been scared. Frank apologizes, and they have sex.

Frank and Helen begin a romance. He has a chance to obtain Helen's fingerprints on a glass but decides to wipe the glass clean. Their relationship becomes strained when she discovers that he is a cop. One night when he is drunk, he nearly gives away the fact that Helen was involved in a sting. He starts to confess his feelings for her, but then discovers that she responded to each of the victims' ads. When he confronts her, Helen refuses to admit to anything, so he throws her out.

Moments later, the real killer bursts into the apartment: Helen's ex-husband Terry, who has been stalking Helen and killing the men she dates. At gunpoint, he makes Frank lie on his bed and show how he made love to Helen, just as he had done to his other victims before murdering them. Frank manages to overpower Terry and tries to call the police, but Terry  lunges at him and, in the ensuing struggle, Frank throws Terry through the bedroom window to his death.

Several weeks later, a newly sober Frank meets Sherman in a bar and later reunites with Helen. She forgives him, and they resume their relationship.

Cast

 Al Pacino as Detective Frank Keller
 Ellen Barkin as Helen Cruger
 John Goodman as Detective Sherman Touhey
 Michael Rooker as Terry Cruger
 William Hickey as Frank Keller Sr.
 Richard Jenkins as Detective Gruber
 John Spencer as Precinct Chief
 Michael O'Neill as Raymond Brown
 Paul Calderón as Serafino
 Gene Canfield as Struk
 Larry Joshua as Dargan
 Christine Estabrook as Gina Gallagher
 Barbara Baxley as Miss Allen
 Patricia Barry as Older Woman
 Luis Antonio Ramos as Omar Maldonado (as Luis Ramos)
 Rafael Báez as Efram Maldonado
 Damien Leake as Ernest Lee
 Jacqueline Brookes as Helen's Mother
 Nancy Beatty as Raymond Brown's Wife
 Hugh Thompson as Young Cop
 Christopher Maleki as Detective (uncredited)

Lorraine Bracco filmed scenes as Keller's ex-wife Denice, which were cut from the theatrical release print, but were restored for television versions. Samuel L. Jackson played a minor role as "Black Guy".

Release and reception

Box office
The film did well domestically, debuting at No. 1. In its second week it had a 22% drop. Sea of Love grossed $58.5 million domestically and $52.3 million overseas to a total of $110.9 million worldwide.

Critical
The movie received positive reviews from critics. Rotten Tomatoes reports that 74% of 31 critics have given the film a positive review, with an average rating of 6.80/10.

In his review in the Los Angeles Times, Kevin Thomas called it "a slick, knowing genre film, through and through, a New York cop suspense thriller that we've seen countless times before," but stated "it can't quite keep us away from wondering how a smart woman like Helen, whose looks would stop traffic and whose work would bring her into constant contact with an array of sophisticated men, would ever resort to the personals - unless, of course, she really is a psychopath." The review in Variety praised the film, calling it "a suspenseful film noir boasting a superlative performance by Al Pacino as a burned-out Gotham cop."

Hal Hinson for The Washington Post stated that if the film "were able to get it all, it would be a great movie. As it is, it's stirring and messy and hints at more than it is capable of delivering." Roger Ebert, giving the film three out of four stars, praised the acting of Al Pacino and Ellen Barkin, but thought "the ending...cheats by bringing in a character from left field at the last moment. Part of the fun in a movie like this is guessing the identity of the killer, and part of the problem...is that the audience is not fairly treated. Technically, I suppose, the plot can be justified. But I felt cheated. I had good feelings for the characters and their relationships, but I walked out feeling the plot played fast and loose with the rules of whodunits."

References

External links
 
 
 
 
 
 

1989 films
1989 thriller films
1980s American films
1980s English-language films
1980s erotic thriller films
1980s psychological thriller films
1980s serial killer films
American erotic thriller films
American neo-noir films
American police detective films
American psychological thriller films
American serial killer films
Films about the New York City Police Department
Films based on American novels
Films directed by Harold Becker
Films produced by Martin Bregman
Films scored by Trevor Jones
Films set in New York City
Films shot in New York City
Films with screenplays by Richard Price (writer)
Universal Pictures films